Neorhizobium galegae is a Gram negative root nodule bacteria. It forms nitrogen-fixing root nodules on legumes in the genus Galega.

References 

Rhizobiaceae
Bacteria described in 2014